King and Maxwell is a crime fiction novel written by American writer David Baldacci. This is the sixth and final installment in the King and Maxwell book series. The book was initially published on November 19, 2013, by Grand Central Publishing.

Plot

It seems at first like a simple, tragic story. Tyler Wingo, a teenage boy, learns the awful news that his father, a soldier, was killed in action in Afghanistan. Then the extraordinary happens: Tyler receives a communication from his father…after his supposed death.

 Tyler hires Sean and Michelle to solve the mystery surrounding his father. But their investigation quickly leads to deeper, more troubling questions. Could Tyler’s father really still be alive? What was his true mission? Could Tyler be the next target?

Sean and Michelle soon realize that they’ve stumbled on to something bigger and more treacherous than anyone could have imagined. And as their hunt for the truth leads them relentlessly to the highest levels of power and to uncovering the most clandestine of secrets, Sean and Michelle are determined to help and protect Tyler–though they may pay for it with their lives.

References

External links
Official website

2013 American novels
Novels by David Baldacci
Grand Central Publishing books